The 2013 Kraft Nabisco Championship was the 42nd Kraft Nabisco Championship, held April 4–7 at the Dinah Shore  Tournament Course of Mission Hills Country Club in Rancho Mirage, California. In its 31st year as a major championship, Inbee Park won her second major title, four strokes ahead of runner-up So Yeon Ryu.

It was the first of Park's three consecutive major victories in 2013; the first to win the opening three majors of a season since Babe Zaharias 

For the first time as a major, a defending champion missed the cut: Sun-Young Yoo was at 153 (+9).

Field
The field of 111 players included nine amateurs.

Past champions in the field

Made the cut

Missed the cut

Round summaries

First round
Thursday, April 4, 2013

Na Yeon Choi, Jodi Ewart Shadoff, and Suzann Pettersen shot 68 (−4) to hold a three-way tie for the lead, with Anna Nordqvist and Amy Yang a stroke back. Defending champion Sun-Young Yoo was tied for 90th place after a 77 (+5). World number one Stacy Lewis, the 2011 champion, had a triple bogey on the 14th hole leading to a 73, five strokes behind the leaders.

Source:

Second round
Friday, April 5, 2013

The cut came at 149 (+5) with 73 players continuing to the weekend, including five of the nine amateurs. Reigning Vare Trophy winner Inbee Park shot 67 (−5) to move into first place with a one-stroke lead over Lizette Salas. Round one co-leaders Shadoff, Choi, and Pettersen fell to three, six, and six strokes back, respectively. Defending champion Yoo missed the cut—the first time in Kraft Nabisco Championship history. Two players, Jeong Jang and Yi Eun-jung, withdrew before completing round two.

Source:

Amateurs: Hedberg (E), Ko (+2), Meadow (+2), Ramsey (+2), Yin (+4), Duncan (+6), Chen (+7), Hall (+10), Lendl (+29).

Third round
Saturday, April 6, 2013

Park and Salas retained their first and second place positions, with Park opening up the lead to three strokes after shooting a bogey-free 67 (−5) and 204 (−12). Six players were tied for third, three shots behind Salas at 210, including Angela Stanford, with a round-low 66 (−6) on Saturday.

Source:

Final round
Sunday, April 7, 2013

Again in the final pairing, Park birdied the first hole while Salas double-bogeyed to double the lead to six strokes. Playing nearly an hour ahead, So Yeon Ryu shot a bogey-free 65 (−7) to climb the leaderboard into solo second place. Park finished with a 69 (−3) to finish with a four-stroke margin over Ryu. Salas shot a 79 (+7) and fell to a tie for 25th place at 286 (−2).

Source:

Amateurs:Ko (−2), Meadow (+1), Ramsey (+2), Yin (+5), Hedberg (+13).

Scorecard
Final round

Cumulative tournament scores, relative to par
{|class="wikitable" span = 50 style="font-size:85%;
|-
|style="background: Red;" width=10|
|Eagle
|style="background: Pink;" width=10|
|Birdie
|style="background: PaleGreen;" width=10|
|Bogey
|style="background: Green;" width=10|
|Double bogey
|}

References

External links

Coverage on the LPGA Tour official site

Chevron Championship
Golf in California
Kraft Nabisco Championship
Kraft Nabisco Championship
Kraft Nabisco Championship
Kraft Nabisco Championship